Lyttelton Tunnel may refer to:

 Lyttelton rail tunnel
 Lyttelton road tunnel